Micropub (MP)  is a W3C Recommendation that describes a client–server protocol based on HTTP to create, update, and delete posts (e.g. social media) on servers using web or native app clients. Micropub was originally developed in the IndieWebCamp community, contributed to W3C, and published as a W3C working draft on January 28, 2016. As of May 23, 2017 it is a W3C Recommendation.

Micropub uses OAuth 2.0 Bearer Tokens for authentication and accepts traditional form posts as well as JSON posts. Posted data uses a vocabulary derived from Microformats. Micropub is mostly used to create "posts", which are similar to Tweets, or micro blog posts, like those posted to Twitter. The protocol supports a variety of different content types however, such as Bookmarks, Favorites, Reposts, Events, RSVPs, and Checkins. Micropub is currently supported on a variety of IndieWeb compatible websites, like micro.blog.

Implementations 

There are numerous Micropub implementations, both clients, and servers, many of them open source.

Clients 
 Quill
 OwnYourGram
 InkStone
 Micropublish
 Dobrado
 iA Writer

Servers 
 Postly
 p3k
 kaku
 Micropub to GitHub
 wordpress-micropub - a WordPress plugin
 Transformative
 aruna
 Micropub for ProcessWire - a ProcessWire plugin
 Dobrado
 Known
 Briefly
 Sweetroll

Services 
 micro.blog

See also 
 OAuth
 MetaWeblog

References

World Wide Web Consortium standards
2017 introductions